Neolissochilus thienemanni is a species of ray-finned fish in the family Cyprinidae.
It is found only in Lake Toba in Sumatra, Indonesia.

References
 

Cyprinid fish of Asia
Fish of Indonesia
Fish described in 1933
Taxonomy articles created by Polbot